The Ieud Hill Church, dedicated to the Nativity of the Virgin, is a Romanian Orthodox church in Ieud Commune, Maramureș County, Romania. Built in the early 17th century, it is one of eight buildings that make up the wooden churches of Maramureș UNESCO World Heritage Site, and is also listed as a historic monument by the country's Ministry of Culture and Religious Affairs. Its name comes from the fact that it is located on a hill, and is used to distinguish it from the Ieud Valley Church.

References

Ieud
17th-century Eastern Orthodox church buildings
Ieud
Romanian Orthodox churches in Romania
Former Greek-Catholic churches in Romania